On 27 March 1966, elections for members of the sixth legislative period of the Hamburg Parliament (Hamburgische Bürgerschaft) after the Second World War were held in the German state of Hamburg. There were 1,375,491 eligible voters.

Results
959,816 voters, meaning a turnout of 69.8%, gave 947,802 valid and 12,014 invalid votes.

Post-election
Herbert Weichmann continued to be the First Mayor of Hamburg.

See also
Elections in Germany
Hamburg state elections in the Weimar Republic
2001 Hamburg state election
2004 Hamburg state election
2008 Hamburg state election

References

1966
Hamburg